Thomas B. Kin Chong (born May 24, 1938) is a Canadian comedian, actor, musician and activist. He is known for his marijuana-themed Cheech & Chong comedy albums and movies with Cheech Marin, as well as playing the character Leo on Fox's That '70s Show. He became a naturalized United States citizen in the late 1980s.

Early life 
Thomas B. Kin Chong was born on May 24, 1938, in Edmonton, Alberta. His mother was a Canadian of Scottish and Irish ancestry, and his father was Chinese who immigrated in the 1930s. He had an older brother, Stan (1936-2018). After arriving in Canada, the senior Chong had first lived with an aunt in Vancouver.

As a youth, Tommy Chong moved with his family to Calgary, settling in a conservative neighbourhood Chong has referred to as "Dog Patch". He has said that his father had "been wounded in World War II and there was a veterans' hospital in Calgary. He bought a $500 house in Dog Patch and raised his family on $50 a week." In an interview, Chong later described how he dropped out of Crescent Heights High School "when I was 16 but probably just before they were going to throw me out anyway." He played guitar to make money. "I discovered that music could get you laid, even if you were a scrawny, long-haired, geeky-looking guy like me."

Career

Music 
By the early 1960s, Chong was playing guitar for a Calgary soul group called the Shades. The Shades moved to Vancouver, British Columbia, where the band's name changed to "Little Daddy & the Bachelors". They recorded a single, "Too Much Monkey Business" / "Junior's Jerk". Together with bandmember Bobby Taylor, Chong opened a Vancouver nightclub in 1963.  Formerly the Alma Theatre, they called it "Blue Balls". They brought in the Ike & Tina Turner Revue, which had never been to Vancouver before. Although Little Daddy & the Bachelors built up a small following, things soured when they went with Chong's suggestion and had themselves billed as "Four Niggers and a Chink" (or, bowing to pressure, "Four N's and a C") before taking on the moniker Bobby Taylor & the Vancouvers.

In 1965, the Vancouvers signed with Gordy Records (a subsidiary of Detroit's Motown Records). They recorded their debut album, an eponymous release, and their debut single, the Tommy Chong co-composition, "Does Your Mama Know About Me," which peaked at number 29 on the Billboard Hot 100. While on tour in Chicago for a short time, the band followed opening act the Jackson 5. Chong later referred to the young Michael Jackson as a "cute little guy". After the band released two additional singles, Chong and bandmate Wes Henderson missed a Friday night performance to apply for green cards so they could become American citizens. Chong was fired by Chris Clark and Motown producer Johnny Bristol for arriving late to the gig. Later, when Berry Gordy told Chong that he wasn't fired after all, that it had been a mistake, Chong said he wanted to stay fired. "I said I want to become a Berry Gordy, I don't want to just work for a Berry Gordy. And he says I can, I can dig that. So he was nice. He gave me $5,000 as the severance and to me that was a fortune." The group broke up shortly afterwards, when Chong tried to reduce the number of players covered by the Vancouvers' contract. He intended that he, Taylor, and Henderson would constitute the group, while other members would be classified as sidemen and session artists.

Cheech & Chong 

Chong co-wrote and performed on many Cheech & Chong comedy albums, four of which were nominated for the Grammy Award for Best Comedy Album. He and Cheech Marin shared the 1973 award in this category for Los Cochinos.

He also directed four of the duo's films, while co-writing and starring in all seven with Cheech.

After Cheech & Chong 

Cheech & Chong, while a very successful comedy act, split in 1985 due to creative differences and Marin's desire to focus on a mainstream acting career. This began a difficult time for Chong. He developed an unsold pilot for CBS called The Martinez Family, which was redeveloped as the 1988 sitcom Trial and Error. In 1990, he directed, wrote and starred in the movie Far Out Man. He did not act regularly until filling the recurring role (later a regular role) as the fun-loving, aging hippie "Leo" (similar to his Chong character) on That '70s Show. Chong was absent during the fifth and sixth seasons of the show as he was serving a brief jail sentence; upon his release, he returned to the series for its final two seasons. He also played a role as a hippie in Dharma & Greg.

Chong was originally going to voice the character of Shenzi, the hyena in the Disney film The Lion King. Cheech Marin voiced Banzai. (The Shenzi character was changed to a female and was voiced instead by Whoopi Goldberg.) Chong provided the voice of the character Yax in the 2016 Disney film Zootopia.

In September 2005, a/k/a Tommy Chong premiered at the Toronto International Film Festival. The documentary, produced, written and directed by Josh Gilbert, chronicles Chong's comedic and personal history. It includes material related to his prosecution by the US Justice Department and imprisonment. The project features interviews with Cheech Marin, Bill Maher, George Thorogood, Peter Coyote, Lou Adler, Eric Schlosser and Jay Leno. In 2011, Chong appeared as a Judge in an episode of Franklin & Bash.

On September 4, 2014, Chong was announced as one of the celebrities participating on the 19th season of Dancing with the Stars. He paired with professional dancer Peta Murgatroyd. Despite being at the bottom of the leaderboard numerous times, Chong and Murgatroyd were able to make it to the night of the semi-finals but were eliminated at the end of that night. Chong is the oldest contestant to have made it to the semi-finals of the show.

On April 4, 2015, Chong appeared as a guest speaker at the annual "Hash Bash" event in Ann Arbor, Michigan, which focuses on cannabis legalization.

In November 2017, Chong guest-starred as himself in an episode of the Trailer Park Boys spinoff Out of the Park: USA. In 2017, Chong also partnered with smoking subscription box service Daily High Club to create the DHC Tommy Chong Signature Smoking Supply Box.

On January 9, 2019, Chong competed in season one of The Masked Singer as "Pineapple" where he sang "I Will Survive" by Gloria Gaynor.

On May 23, 2019, Chong appeared on episode #1303 of the internet video podcast The Joe Rogan Experience, hosted by Joe Rogan.

On June 19, 2019, Chong appeared on episode #694 of the internet video podcast "The Church Of What's Happening Now", hosted by Joey Diaz.

In April 2020, Chong's brand started working alongside the fashion brand Slicks.
 
On December 18, 2020, Chong appeared in the online cannabis publication The Green Fund for an interview to discuss his career with Cheech & Chong and his upcoming branded dispensaries.

Legal issues

U.S. v. Chong 
In 2003, Chong became caught up in two American investigations, code-named Operation Pipe Dreams and Operation Headhunter, which tried to trace drug traffic and users through businesses selling drug paraphernalia, mostly bongs. Operation Pipe Dreams was run from Pittsburgh. US Attorney for Western Pennsylvania Mary Beth Buchanan oversaw the case. The estimated cost of Operation Pipe Dreams was over $12 million and included the resources of 2,000 law enforcement officers. Fifty-five companies that sold drug paraphernalia over the Internet were the subject of the investigation, and Nice Dreams was one of them.

Chong was charged for his part in financing and promoting Chong Glass/Nice Dreams, a company started by his son Paris. His case never went to trial, as his attorney negotiated a plea agreement with the US Attorney for the Western District of Pennsylvania's Office. He admitted to distributing 7,500 bongs and water pipes on the Internet through Nice Dreams. Chong agreed to plead guilty to one count of conspiracy to distribute drug paraphernalia in exchange for non-prosecution of his wife, Shelby, and his son, Paris. Chong cooperated with the government and was the first of the Operation Pipe Dreams defendants to plead guilty.

At Chong's sentencing, Assistant U.S. Attorney for Western Pennsylvania Mary McKeen Houghton said in her arguments that Tommy Chong "used his public image to promote this crime" and marketed his products to children. U.S. Attorney Mary Beth Buchanan also was present at the sentencing in Pittsburgh and released a statement to the press stating, "There are consequences for violating the law, even if the violator is a well-known entertainer like Thomas Chong."

While Chong argued for community service and home detention at his sentencing, the district judge, Arthur J. Schwab, denied his requests and sentenced him to 9 months in federal prison, a fine of $20,000, forfeiture of $103,514, and the loss of all merchandise seized during the raid of his business. Chong served his sentence at the Taft Correctional Institution from October 8, 2003, to July 7, 2004. He was a cellmate of "The Wolf of Wall Street" Jordan Belfort, who credits him for encouraging Belfort to write his memoirs. They have remained friends ever since.

These events were among those chronicled in a/k/a Tommy Chong (2006), a documentary by Josh Gilbert. It premiered theatrically at the New York Film Forum in New York City and won awards. His time in prison was also a main point in his book, "The I Chong".

Controversy 

While government officials denied that Chong was treated any differently from the other defendants, supporters felt his celebrity status was being used against him. Chong's publicist Brandie Knight said the Chong family was shocked by the raid. "We've done everything the right way, and the government is saying there is no right way," Knight said. Supporters started the "Free Tommy Chong!" movement that called for his release. They questioned why Chong was prosecuted rather than his son Paris Chong, who was CEO of the business. They also pointed to the disparity in sentences between Chong's and those of other defendants, and they protested the DEA tactics used in the investigation.

Paris Chong had started Nice Dreams in 1999. He was never charged with his crimes in relation to the investigation, as part of a plea bargain. When asked why the government had focused on Chong rather than his son the CEO, US Attorney Mary Beth Buchanan said that "Tommy Chong was the more responsible corporate officer because he financed and marketed the product."

Of the 55 people who were subjects of the investigation, Chong was the only one without previous convictions who received jail time. When questioned on the sentencing, U.S. Attorney Mary Beth Buchanan noted that Chong had never gone to trial and made a plea bargain. She said, "He was a relatively new player, but he had the ability to market products like no other."

During its investigation of Nice Dreams, federal agents posed as head-shop owners from Beaver County in western Pennsylvania. They asked Paris Chong to sell them pipes through the mail to a fictitious shop in the town of Beaver Falls,  from Pittsburgh. Paris Chong had been prohibited from selling to Pittsburgh or anywhere in Western Pennsylvania because of the successful federal prosecution of Akhil Kumar Mishra and his wife, Rajeshwari, who had two head shops in the city. Accounts differ as to who in Nice Dreams went against Chong's prohibition, or even if it had been made up by the defence, but the sales did take place to the agents. This enabled the U.S. Attorney to show jurisdiction in Pennsylvania for Chong's illegal activities, as opposed to California, which was the base for Nice Dreams.

Aftermath 
In December 2004, Chong was to appear in an off-Broadway show entitled The Marijuana-Logues, a parody of Eve Ensler's The Vagina Monologues. His parole officer barred him from the show and the tour was cancelled, as audience members were smoking pot during performances. Such exposure would cause Chong to violate the terms of his parole. In 2006, Chong published a memoir about his experiences in jail and his exploration of meditation, called The I Chong: Meditations from the Joint.

In 2010, Chong and Cyril Wecht appeared at a Democratic Party fundraiser in Pittsburgh, Pennsylvania, to aid the campaign against Mary Beth Buchanan, the United States Attorney who prosecuted him. She was running as a Republican candidate for the United States House of Representatives. She was defeated in the Republican primary.

Seizure of a/k/a Tommy Chong DVDs 
On May 7, 2008, federal agents raided Spectrum Labs in an investigation related to its "detoxification" products. The search was one of nine conducted for Operation True Test, an investigation being led by Buchanan, still the U.S. Attorney for the Western District of Pennsylvania. It targeted companies that sold so-called "masking products," intended to help drug users pass employer drug tests. No federal law bans such products; they are regulated on a state-by-state basis. Of the nine search warrants issued, none was for businesses within Buchanan's district.

Chong claimed that federal agents had seized 8,000–10,000 copies of the yet-to-be released documentary, a/k/a Tommy Chong, from Spectrum Labs, but their attorney said no DVDs were taken. In a press release, Chong said, "[The seizure of the DVDs is] a way to punish the distributor financially. There's no way to get the DVDs back until the investigation is over." Chong said he did not have any ownership of the film. The Pittsburgh Post-Gazette later amended its story, saying that an "undisclosed number of DVDs was taken". It noted the government is not required to disclose a reason for the seizure as the raid was part of "an ongoing investigation".

Reuniting with Cheech 

Chong appeared with his long-time comedy partner, Cheech Marin, in a 2000 South Park episode called "Cherokee Hair Tampons".

In mid-2008, Cheech & Chong reunited and started touring. The tour was called Light Up America and Canada and The Felimony Tour, which referred to major experiences of each. In October 2008, they appeared on The Howard Stern Show , the Opie and Anthony Show,  and the Ron and Fez Show on SIRIUS/XM Satellite Radio. On March 1, 2010, they hosted WWE Raw in Oklahoma City. On March 13, 2011, Cheech & Chong were guest stars on The Simpsons episode "A Midsummer's Nice Dream", where, during a reunion tour, Homer briefly replaced Chong before the pair reconciled.

Cheech Marin appeared in Tommy Chong's first dance in the season opener of Dancing with the Stars on September 15, 2014. Around this same time, Cheech and Chong appeared together on the Internet-based, pro-marijuana show, Getting Doug with High.

Personal life 
In 1960, Chong married Maxine Sneed in Canada. They raised two daughters, Rae Dawn (b. 1961) by his previous wife Gail Lewis, and Robbi Chong (b. 1965). They divorced in 1970.

In 1975, Chong married Shelby Fiddis in Los Angeles. They had three children, sons Paris (b. 1974) and Gilbran (b. 1981) and daughter Precious Chong (b. 1968). In 1978, the couple adopted Marcus Wyatt. Rae Dawn, Robbi, Marcus, Paris, and Precious Chong have each pursued careers in acting. In addition to film work, in May 2011, Precious Chong had her play, Push ... One Mother of a Show, produced in Toronto.

In an interview, Tommy Chong shared that he smoked with Willie Nelson, Snoop Dogg, Arnold Schwarzenegger, and his bodybuilding buddies, also with all the Beatles except Paul McCartney. He also calls George Harrison his favorite smoking friend.

In the late 1980s, Chong became a naturalized citizen of the United States. Rae Dawn Chong has also become a naturalized U.S. citizen.

Tommy Chong has become a marijuana activist and supports legalizing the plant's use. He is a regular contributor to Cannabis Culture Magazine and sits on the NORML (National Organization for the Reform of Marijuana Laws) advisory board.

Cancer diagnosis 
Chong announced on June 9, 2012, that he is battling prostate cancer. He described the cancer "as a slow stage one [that I've] had for a long time". He said that he had been drug free for about three years, during which time he began having prostate-related problems.

On July 15, 2012, Chong tweeted that the hemp oil treatment he had been using to cure his cancer was effective and that he is "99% cancer free". However, on June 16, 2015, Chong stated that he had been diagnosed with colorectal cancer and was "using cannabis like crazy" in order to endure the treatment.

In 2019, Chong announced that he is "cancer-free". He also opined that stress could have been a cause of his diagnosis.

Filmography

Film

Television

References

External links 

 
 
 Entry at thecanadianencyclopedia.ca
 Chong's Bongs Gone Wrong A Newsweek article by Brian Braiker about Tommy Chong's various legal problems
 HoboTrashcan's One on One with Tommy Chong An in-depth interview about politics, Cheech and Chong and Tommy's wife and kids
 An Interview With Tommy Chong A Stumped? magazine article by Zach Freeman
 Video interview with Tommy Chong on 'Connected Life'
Published in Flagpole Magazine, p. 31 (December 20, 2006).
 Tommy Chong Interview Silver Screen Studios - Dispatches from Quarantine (June 26, 2020)

20th-century American male actors
20th-century Canadian male actors
21st-century American male actors
20th-century American writers
20th-century Canadian writers
20th-century Canadian male writers
20th-century American comedians
21st-century American comedians
American cannabis activists
American male actors of Chinese descent
American male comedians
American male film actors
American male screenwriters
American male television actors
American male voice actors
Businesspeople in the cannabis industry
Canadian cannabis activists
Canadian emigrants to the United States
Canadian male actors of Chinese descent
Canadian male comedians
Canadian male film actors
Canadian male television actors
Canadian male voice actors
Canadian male screenwriters
20th-century Canadian screenwriters
Canadian people of French descent
Canadian people of Ulster-Scottish descent
Living people
Canadian psychedelic drug advocates
Film directors from Edmonton
Male actors from Edmonton
Writers from Edmonton
American people convicted of drug offenses
Victoria School of Performing and Visual Arts alumni
Grammy Award winners
American film directors of Chinese descent
American people of Scotch-Irish descent
Naturalized citizens of the United States
Comedians from Alberta
1938 births
Asian-Canadian filmmakers